Polystachya elegans is a species of orchid. It is found in Cameroon.

References

External links

elegans
Plants described in 1881
Orchids of Cameroon